Eupithecia joanata is a moth in the family Geometridae first described by Samuel E. Cassino and Louis W. Swett in 1922. It is found in southern California, United States.

The wingspan is about 17 mm. Adults have been recorded on wing from December to March.

References

Moths described in 1922
joanata
Moths of North America